Imago Relationship Therapy (IRT) is a form of therapy that focuses on relationship counseling.

IRT was developed by Harville Hendrix and Helen LaKelly Hunt. The word imago is Latin for "image"; in this sense, it is referring to the "unconscious image of similar love," according to one therapist. 

A 2017 study of the method's effectiveness found that couples participating in IRT increased marital satisfaction during treatment (and to a lesser-extent at a follow-up) but that the improvements were not clinically significant.

References 

Interpersonal relationships
Relationship counseling